Gymnadenia rhellicani (common name: dark vanilla orchid or black vanilla orchid) is a European species of orchid.

Description
Some plants, especially in the south of the species' range have noticeably paler flowers.

Distribution

Taxonomy
The species was described as a distinct species in 1990 by Herwig Teppner and Erich Klein, who noted that it was diploid and reproduced sexually, in contrast to the rest of the wider Gymnadenia nigra group, which is polyploid and apomictic. At the time, all these taxa were in the genus Nigritella, but that was later subsumed into Gymnadenia. The specific epithet "rhellicanus" commemorates Johannes Rhellicanus, who in 1536 made the earliest description of the species known to the authors.Rhellicanus himself called the plant Christimanus ("Christ's hand").

References

External links

rhellicani
Plants described in 1990